Jean Bart (1650–1702) was a French naval commander and privateer.

Jean Bart may also refer to:
 Jean Bart (writer) (1879/80–1955), an American writer 
 Jean-Bart, a French automobile manufacturer of the early twentieth century
 Eugeniu Botez or Jean Bart (1877–1933), Romanian  novelist

Vessels
 , a 74-gun ship of the line
 , a 20-gun corvette
 , a 24-gun corvette of the French Navy from 1794 that the Royal Navy captured in 1795 and sold in 1797.
 , an 80-gun ship of the line
 Jean Bart, a ship of the line originally named Donawerth
 , a first class cruiser of 4,800 tonnes
 , a 23,600 tonne battleship
 , the last French battleship completed
  (1988), an anti-aircraft frigate
 Le Jean Bart (2002), a replica of a 1670 84-gun ship-of-the-line

See also
 French ship Jean Bart, an expanded list of French naval vessels and privateers named after Jean Bart

Bart, Jean